Harry Anderson "Dixie" Fleager (July 10, 1882 – October 5, 1971) was an American football coach.  He was the second head football coach at Northern Illinois State Normal School—now known as Northern Illinois University—in DeKalb, Illinois, serving for one season, in 1904, and compiling a record of 5–0.

Head coaching record

References

External links
 

1882 births
1971 deaths
Northern Illinois Huskies football coaches
Northwestern Wildcats football players
People from Iroquois County, Illinois
Players of American football from Illinois